Surabhi Foundation (abbreviated as SuFo, Hindi सुरभि) is a registered not-for-profit organisation working for improvement of socio-economic condition of farmers and artisans in rural India. SuFo works for a healthy and equitable self-reliant society. This is brought about by accomplishing rural prosperity and growth through adopting environmentally harmonious farming systems, utilizing local natural resources and availing non farming opportunities integrating indigenous and global knowledge, people-centered development and empowerment approach.

Activities 
Surabhi Foundation is dedicated towards its mission by conducting following activities.

Sustainable Rural Development
 Farmer Development
 Employment Generation
 Education
 Livestock Development
 Entrepreneurship Development
 Renascence
 
Urban Health
 Natural Food
 Desi Cow Milk
 
Improving socio-economic status of women

Projects 
 Rural Empowerment Project - Bundelkhand
 Handmade Paper Renasance Project - Kalpi Project
 Cow Breed Development - Uttarakhand Project

References 

Agricultural organisations based in India